Edwin F. Kenswil (1884 – February 19, 1957) was an American politician. He was born in Boston, Massachusetts in 1884.

Kenswil was elected in 1942 to the Missouri House of Representatives and served a single term for the fourth district of St. Louis. Liza Kenswil (c1886-1981), an NAACP official, was his wife. He proposed legislation to desegregate public venues in Missouri. He was the only African-American serving in Missouri’s legislature.

See also
List of African-American officeholders (1900–1959)

References

1884 births
1957 deaths
Democratic Party members of the Missouri House of Representatives
Politicians from St. Louis
African-American state legislators in Missouri
20th-century American politicians
20th-century African-American politicians